Elizabeth Bruce Hardwick (July 27, 1916 – December 2, 2007) was an American literary critic, novelist, and short story writer.

Early life
Elizabeth Bruce Hardwick was born as the eighth of eleven children in Lexington, Kentucky, on July 27, 1916, to strict Protestant parents, the daughter of Eugene Allen Hardwick, a plumbing and heating contractor, and Mary (née Ramsey) Hardwick.

She graduated from the University of Kentucky with a BA in 1938 and with an MA in 1939. She then entered the PhD program at Columbia University. She withdrew from graduate study in 1941 to concentrate on writing. She was awarded a Guggenheim Fellowship in 1947.

Career
In 1959, Hardwick published in Harper's, "The Decline of Book Reviewing", a generally harsh and even scathing critique of book reviews published in American periodicals of the time. She published four books of criticism: A View of My Own (1962), Seduction and Betrayal (1974), Bartleby in Manhattan (1983), and Sight-Readings (1998). In 1961, she edited The Selected Letters of William James.

The 1962 New York City newspaper strike helped inspire Hardwick, Robert Lowell, Jason Epstein, Barbara Epstein, and Robert B. Silvers to found The New York Review of Books, a publication that became as much a habit for many readers as The New York Times Book Review, which Hardwick had eviscerated in her 1959 essay.

In the 1970s and early 1980s, Hardwick taught writing seminars at Barnard College and Columbia University's School of the Arts, Writing Division. She gave forthright critiques of student writing and was a mentor to students she considered promising.

She was elected a fellow of the American Academy of Arts and Sciences in 1996. In 2000, she published a short biography, Herman Melville, in Viking Press's Penguin Lives series.

In 2008, the Library of America selected Hardwick's account of Caryl Chessman's crimes for inclusion in its two-century retrospective of American True Crime writing. A collection of her short fiction, The New York Stories of Elizabeth Hardwick, was published posthumously in 2010, as was The Collected Essays of Elizabeth Hardwick in 2017.

In 2021, Cathy Curtis published a biography of Hardwick, A Splendid Intelligence: The Life of Elizabeth Hardwick.

Personal life
From July 28, 1949, until their eventual divorce in 1972, she was married to Robert Lowell, the Pulitzer Prize‐winning poet from the prominent Boston Brahmin family. Despite the difficulties of their often tumultuous union, Hardwick maintained that Lowell was the best thing that had ever happened to her. Their daughter was Harriet Lowell.

She died in a Manhattan hospital on December 2, 2007, aged 91.

Published works
Hardwick was the author of three novels and a biography of American novelist Herman Melville:

 The Ghostly Lover (1945)
 The Simple Truth (1955)
 Sleepless Nights (1979)
 Herman Melville (2000)

References

External links

 Elizabeth Hardwick Collection at the Harry Ransom Center at the University of Texas at Austin.
 Guide to the Elizabeth Hardwick manuscript, 1955 housed at the University of Kentucky Libraries Special Collections Research Center.

1916 births
2007 deaths
20th-century American non-fiction writers
20th-century American novelists
20th-century American short story writers
20th-century American women writers
American literary critics
American women critics
American women non-fiction writers
American women novelists
American women short story writers
Columbia University faculty
Fellows of the American Academy of Arts and Sciences
Kentucky women writers
Members of the American Academy of Arts and Letters
Novelists from Kentucky
Novelists from New York (state)
The New York Review of Books people
The New York Review of Books
University of Kentucky alumni
Women literary critics
Writers from Lexington, Kentucky
Writers from Manhattan